Twelve teams are scheduled to compete in the women's football tournament at the 2024 Summer Olympics. In addition to France, the host nation, 11 women's national teams will qualify from six separate continental confederations.

Table
On 24 February 2022, the FIFA Council approved the slot allocation for the 2024 Summer Olympics. In addition to the automatic qualification of the host nation France, each confederation will be given two slots, with the exception of the OFC which is given one slot.

{| class="wikitable"
|-
!Means of qualification
!Dates
!Venue(s)
!Berth(s)
!Qualified
|-
|Host nation
|
|
|align=center|1
|
|-
|2022 CONCACAF Championship
|4–18 July 2022
|
|align=center|1
|
|-
|2022 Copa América
|8–30 July 2022
|
|align=center|2
|
|-
|CONCACAF play-off
|September 2023
|TBC
|align=center|1
|
|-
|2024 AFC Olympic Qualifying Tournament
|27 November – 6 December 2023
|TBC
|align=center|2
|
|-
|2024 UEFA Women's Nations League Finals
|TBC 2024
|TBC
|align=center|2
|
|-
|2024 CAF Olympic Qualifying Tournament
|TBC
|TBC
|align=center|2
|
|-
|OFC qualifying
|TBC
|TBC
|align=center|1
|
|-
!Total
!
!colspan=1| 
!12
! 
|}

 Dates and venues are those of final tournaments (or final round of qualification tournaments); various qualification stages may precede these matches.

AFC

The format has yet to be announced.

CAF

The format has yet to be announced.

CONCACAF
The 2022 CONCACAF W Championship will be used as the first round of Olympic qualification. The winners of the tournament will qualify, while the teams finishing second and third will contest a play-off for the other qualification place.

Qualification round

Final tournament

Group stage

Knockout stage

Play-off

CONMEBOL

The finalists of the 2022 Copa América Femenina earned Olympic qualification places.

Group stage

Knockout stage

OFC
The format has yet to be announced.

UEFA

The League A of the 2023–24 UEFA Women's Nations League will determine the European nations for the Summer Olympics, with the top two teams of the 2024 UEFA Women's Nations League Finals (not including France) qualifying for the Olympics.

It is possible for Great Britain to qualify for the Olympic Games through the placing of England, assuming the football associations of the Home Nations maintain an agreement regarding the women's Olympic team.

References

 
Women